Cyrus the Great Day is an unofficial Iranian holiday that takes place on the seventh day of Aban, the eighth month of the Solar Hijri calendar (October 29th on the Gregorian calendar), to commemorate Cyrus the Great, the founder of the ancient Achaemenid Persian Empire.

The holiday prominently consists of gatherings at the tomb of Cyrus in Pasargadae, Fars Province. 2016 observance sparked a revolt and protest against the current regime.  In October 2021 Iranian police barred people from visiting the mausoleum.

History of observance 
Based on some historical records, 29 October was the day when Cyrus entered Babylon after the Neo-Babylonian Empire fell to the Achaemenid Persians in the Battle of Opis. The holiday is observed by Iranian nationalists and monarchists to pay homage to Iran's pre-Islamic history. 

The celebrations are unofficial, and the holiday is not designated on any official calendar, neither on the Iranian calendars nor on those of the UNESCO. There have been calls for the Iranian government to recognize the day at the official level. In 2017, Bahram Parsaei, the representative of the electoral district of Shiraz in the Iranian parliament, openly voiced the demand for the state to recognize and observe the holiday.

2016 Cyrus the Great Revolt 

In 2016, the holiday occurred on 28 October (due to the overlapping of leap years in the Iranian and Gregorian calendars) and fell on Friday (official weekend day in Iran due to its Islamic significance). Consequently, the tomb of Cyrus at Pasargadae attracted thousands of people from across the country who celebrated the day and chanted nationalist slogans. Nomads, tribesmen and ethnic minorities, including Kurds and Iranian Arabs, were present at the celebrations in their traditional ethnic clothing. The attendance was unprecedented according to spectators, and the roads leading to the tomb reportedly saw a large traffic jam.

An unofficial 2017 estimate puts the attendance figure at between 15,000 and 20,000 people.

Protests 
The gatherings eventually morphed into protests against the ruling Islamic theocracy. Iranian protestors reportedly chanted "No Gaza, no Palestine, we will only sacrifice ourselves for Iran!", "Iran is our homeland; Cyrus is our father," and “Clerical rule is synonymous with only tyranny, only war,” as well as “Freedom of thought cannot take place with beards” were among the slogans in the amateur videos going viral on social media.

According to Reuters, protesters shouted anti-Arab and pro-Shah slogans. A judiciary official said that the organizers of the event were arrested.

2017 government crackdown 
In October 2017, an official statement by local authorities from the Ministry of Cultural Heritage, Handicrafts and Tourism in Fars Province was published and circulated on social media, declaring that Cyrus' tomb would be closed to the Iranian public between 27 and 30 October 2017. However, the director of the ministry officially denied that any plans for a shutdown of the tomb were being made in the days leading up to the holiday.

Subsequently, all roads leading to Pasargad County were closed by Iranian authorities, who cited "ongoing construction" as the reason for the shutdown. Fences were erected around the mausoleum in Pasargadae and paramilitary Basij troops were stationed in the region to hold a drill. The mouthpiece of the Iranian judiciary stated that the Ministry of Intelligence had disrupted plans for the "illegal gathering" on Cyrus the Great Day.

References

Cultural depictions of Cyrus the Great
Remembrance days
October observances
Observances set by the Solar Hijri calendar
Autumn events in Iran